This is a list of the most consecutive appearances in the NCAA Division I men's basketball tournament by programs.

Consecutive appearances by team

Current consecutive appearances by team

Table up to date through the 2022 NCAA tournament. Only schools with five or more consecutive appearances are included.

References

Consecutive Appearances
College basketball in the United States lists